Tom Williams (born 12 October 1983) is an English former rugby union player who played for Harlequins in the Aviva Premiership. He normally played at either full-back or on the wing.

Early life
Williams was born in Brighton and attended Windlesham House School. He represented Wales at U16 and U19 level, then switched to England for the 2002 IRB U19 World Cup.

International career
Williams represented England in the 2003-04 World Sevens Series, winning the Hong Kong leg. He also competed in the 2006-07 IRB Sevens World Series.

Club career
Williams started and scored a try for Harlequins in their 2011–12 Premiership final victory over Leicester Tigers. He is a member of the “200 Club” having represented Harlequins for over 200 games.

He retired in 2015.

Bloodgate

During the 2008–09 Heineken Cup quarter final against Leinster,  Williams was told to fake a blood injury by Dean Richards to allow a tactical substitution to reintroduce Nick Evans leading to the bloodgate scandal. This resulted in a 12-month ban for Williams, (reduced to four months on appeal), a three-year ban for former director of rugby Dean Richards as well as a two-year ban for physiotherapist Steph Brennan from the ERC with a £260,000 fine for the club.

References

External links

 Tom Williams profile England Rugby
 Tom Williams profile Harlequins

1983 births
Living people
English rugby union players
Harlequin F.C. players
People educated at Windlesham House School
Rugby union controversies
Rugby union fullbacks
Rugby union players from Brighton